Peseta may refer to:
Spanish peseta, a former currency of Spain
Equatorial Guinean peseta, a former currency of Equatorial Guinea
Sahrawi peseta, the de jure currency of the Sahrawi Arab Democratic Republic
Catalan peseta, a former currency of Catalonia
La Peseta (Madrid Metro), Madrid Metro station